Theppakadu is a village in the Nilgiris district in the Indian state of Tamil Nadu. It has a reserve forest which is part of the Mudumalai National Park in western Tamil Nadu touching the south of Karnataka.

Elephant Camp 

The Theppakadu Elephant Camp in the Mudumalai National Park is a tourist attraction.  The camp was formed over in 1910 for elephants used by timber traders.  After the Government took over the forests, the working elephants or kumkis now do a variety of tasks.  They are used to give rides to tourists and for patrolling during the monsoon.

References

External links
 The Niligiris
 About
 Pandalur

Villages in Nilgiris district